Suki Kim is a Korean American journalist and writer. She is the author of two books: the award-winning novel The Interpreter and a book of investigative journalism, Without You, There Is No Us: Undercover Among the Sons of North Korea's Elite. Kim is the only writer ever to have lived undercover in North Korea to conduct immersive journalism. Kim is currently a contributing editor at The New Republic.

Early life
Kim was born in Seoul, South Korea, and immigrated to the United States with her family at thirteen. Kim is a naturalized American citizen.

Kim graduated from Barnard College with a Bachelor of Arts degree in English. Kim also studied East Asian Literature at the School of Oriental and African Studies in London. She has received a Fulbright Research Grant, a Guggenheim Fellowship, and an Open Society Foundations Fellowship. Kim was also a Ferris Journalism Fellow at Princeton University, where she was a visiting lecturer.

Work

The Interpreter 
Kim's debut novel, The Interpreter, published by Farrar, Straus & Giroux, is a murder mystery about a young Korean-American woman, Suzy Park, living in New York City and searching for answers as to why her shopkeeper parents were murdered. Kim took a short term job as an interpreter in New York City when working on the novel to look into the life of an interpreter. The book received positive critic reviews and won several awards. The Interpreter was translated into Dutch, French, Korean, Italian, and Japanese.

Visits to North Korea and second book 
Kim visited North Korea in February 2002 to participate in the 60th birthday celebration of Kim Jong-il. She documented this experience in a February 2003 cover essay for The New York Review of Books.

Kim accompanied the New York Philharmonic in February 2008, when they traveled to Pyongyang for the historical cultural visit to North Korea from the United States. Her article, "A Really Big Show: The New York Philharmonic's fantasia in North Korea," was published in Harper's Magazine in December 2008.

Her second book, Without You, There Is No Us: Undercover Among the Sons of North Korea's Elite, is a work of investigative journalism about her three and a half months in Pyongyang, where she taught English at the Pyongyang University of Science and Technology in 2011.

The book has resulted in some controversy, with reviewers claiming that Kim brought harm on the students she wrote about, and that she caused tensions between the university and the North Korean government. The university staff accused Kim of making false claims about them. However, Kim addressed her critics in a June 2016 essay in The New Republic. Kim mentioned the shortcomings of labelling her second book as a memoir and the irony in reviewers dismissing this work for containing the components typically praised in investigative journalism. Kim also described how racism and sexism influenced public views on her expertise. Her publisher subsequently removed the label "memoir" from the cover of Without You, There Is No Us.

Latest work 
In 2017, Suki Kim broke a sexual harassment scandal against John Hockenberry at WNYC in her article in The Cut. Her investigation led to the firing of two longterm WNYC hosts, Leonard Lopate and Jonathan Schwartz, as well as the eventual resignation of its CEO, Laura Walker, and Chief Content officer, Dean Cappello. Her article was voted as the Best Investigative Reporting of 2017 by Longreads.

In 2020, Kim published an investigative feature in The New Yorker on Free Joseon, a group that has declared itself a provisional government for North Korea, and she was the first to interview the group's leader Adrian Hong while he was on the run from the Department of Justice.

Bibliography

Books

Anthologies

Essays and op-eds

About North Korea and South Korea

Other work

Awards

Fellowships

See also 

 List of Asian American writers

References

External links

 Official Website
 Suki Kim on Twitter

Living people
1970 births
American writers of Korean descent
South Korean emigrants to the United States
Barnard College alumni
People from Seoul
Gwangsan Kim clan
21st-century American women writers
21st-century American memoirists
Writers from New York City
American women memoirists